National Socialism / White Power Crew (NS/WP Crew, also known as Sparrows Crew), is a Neo-Nazi extremist group operating in Russia, recognized by the Supreme Court of Russia as a terrorist organization.

History 
According to Mediazona, many unrelated Nazi groups used the NS/WP abbreviation in the 2000s.

In 2010, two NS/WP members were charged with the murder of a Ghanaian citizen in 2009.

In 2014, nine members of this organization, aged 17 to 24, were sentenced to 4–9 years in prison for a series of murders, attacks and robberies, as well as committing other crimes motivated by ethnic hatred. Members of the organization recorded one of the murders on camera and posted it on the Internet. In addition, they set fire to a car with two homeless people sleeping in it and carried out several more attacks on foreigners and people leading an asocial lifestyle, according to the prosecution. Members of the group were also found guilty of setting fire to a temple, a construction crane, and blowing up a public transport stop using a makeshift device. The last crime was regarded as a terrorist attack.

On 21 May 2021, the movement was recognized as a terrorist organization by the authorities of the Russian Federation and banned.

NS/WP Crew are also involved in the arson of military enlistment offices, which began after the announcement of mobilization in Russia.

Assassination attempt on Vladimir Solovyov 
On 25 April 2022, the Federal Security Service announced the arrest of a group of members of an organization that was making preparations to attempt the assassination of pro-government journalist Vladimir Solovyov. According to the FSB, the assassination was prepared by order of the Security Service of Ukraine. During the searches, the suspects were found and seized with an improvised explosive device, incendiary devices like Molotov cocktails, pistols, a sawed-off hunting rifle, a grenade, cartridges, drugs and forged Ukrainian passports. In addition, nationalist literature and paraphernalia were found. Among the detainees was also one of the leaders of NS/WP Andrey Pronsky, who in 2013, on behalf of NS/WP, committed the murder of a Jewish person, for which he was sent for compulsory treatment.

A day earlier, Russian President Putin announced that the FSB had stopped an attempted assassination of an unnamed Russian journalist.

In June, a sixth defendant was arrested in the case of plotting Solovyov's assassination.

However, the legitimacy of this plot has been questioned.

See also 
Combat Terrorist Organization
The Savior (paramilitary organization)

National Socialist Society
Primorsky Partisans

References

Far-right politics in Russia
Neo-Nazi organizations
Neo-Nazism in Russia
Resistance during the 2022 Russian invasion of Ukraine
Russian nationalist organizations
Neo-fascist terrorism